Lepidolaenaceae is a family of liverworts belonging to the order Porellales.

Genera:
 Gackstroemia Trevis.
 Lepidogyna R.M.Schust.
 Lepidolaena Dumort.

References

Porellales
Liverwort families